The 2021–22 Eastern Kentucky Colonels men's basketball team represented Eastern Kentucky University in the 2021–22 NCAA Division I men's basketball season. The Colonels, led by fourth-year head coach A. W. Hamilton, played their home games at McBrayer Arena within Alumni Coliseum as members of the West Division of the ASUN Conference.

Previous season
In a season limited due to the ongoing COVID-19 pandemic, the Colonels finished the 2020–21 season 22–7, 15–5 in OVC play to finish in third place. They lost to Morehead State in the semifinals of the OVC tournament in their 73rd and final season as members of the Ohio Valley Conference. EKU joined the ASUN Conference on July 1, 2021.

Roster

Schedule and results 

|-
!colspan=12 style=|Non-conference regular season

|-
!colspan=9 style=| ASUN Conference regular season

|-
!colspan=12 style=| ASUN tournament

Source

References

Eastern Kentucky Colonels men's basketball seasons
Eastern Kentucky Colonels
Eastern Kentucky Colonels men's basketball
Eastern Kentucky Colonels men's basketball